Prince Daye (born 11 April 1978) is a Liberian former footballer who played at both professional and international levels as a midfielder.

Career
Daye played in Ghana for Real Republican, in Liberia for Invincible Eleven, in France for Bastia, in Tunisia for Club Africain, in Spain for Badajoz, in Israel for Maccabi Petah Tikva and in Qatar for Al-Sailiya. After leaving Al-Sailiya in 2007, Daye trialled with Major League Soccer side Los Angeles Galaxy.

Daye also earned 25 caps for Liberia between 1996 and 2004, scoring seven goals. During his international career, Daye appeared in 10 FIFA World Cup qualifying matches.

References

1978 births
Living people
Sportspeople from Monrovia
Association football midfielders
Liberian footballers
Liberian expatriate footballers
Liberia international footballers
SC Bastia players
Club Africain players
CD Badajoz players
Maccabi Petah Tikva F.C. players
Expatriate footballers in Israel
Expatriate footballers in France
Expatriate footballers in Spain
Expatriate footballers in Tunisia
Expatriate footballers in Qatar
Ligue 1 players
Segunda División B players
Al-Sailiya SC players
2002 African Cup of Nations players